Winter's is a popular Peruvian brand of chocolates and other food products owned by Compañía Nacional de Chocolates de Perú S.A.

History 
The brand was started in 1997 by Lima-based Good Foods S.A., the largest Peruvian exporter of chocolates.  On 1 February 2007, Colombian-based food conglomerate Grupo Nacional de Chocolates purchased Good Foods S.A. and the Winter's brand for US$36 million through its Peruvian subsidiary Compañía Nacional de Chocolates de Perú S.A.

Products 
Winter's has more than forty brands in its portfolio of products, including cocoas, milk modifiers, chocolates, cookies, candies, gums, lozenges, chewing gum, icings, cream confections, marshmallows, and panettone.

 Chocopunch - A cream confection similar to cake icing sold in small containers packaged with a plastic stick for eating the product.

References

External links 
 Winter's Official Site

Brand name confectionery
Peruvian brands